Saturday Night is the second and final studio album from American R&B group Zhané, released April 22, 1997, on Motown Records. The duo broke up in 1999.

The album peaked at number forty-one on the Billboard 200 chart.

Release and reception
Leo Stanley of AllMusic called the album "infectious" and "more textured and funkier than [Zhané's] debut album."

Track listing

Chart history

Album

Singles

"—" denotes releases that did not chart.

Personnel
Information taken from Allmusic.
art direction – Carol Friedman
bass – Kirk Lyons
composing – Naheem "Pop Holiday" Bowens, Michael Harrison, Jean Norris, Gus Redman, Jeffrey Simon
design – David Harley
drums – Naheem "Pop Holiday" Bowens, Steve Williams
engineering – Ben Arrindell, Mike Iverson
executive production – Celestine, Edward "DJ Eddie F" Ferrell, Andre Harrell, Kay Gee, Charm Warren, Zhané
guitar – Norman Brown, Mike Campbell
guitar (bass) – Tony Bridges, Freddie Cash
keyboards – Scott Booker, Naheem "Pop Holiday" Bowens
mastering – Chris Gehringer
mixing – Daniel Abrahams
multi-instruments – Scott Booker, Malik Pendleton, J.R. Swinga
percussion – Peter Basil, Bashiri Johnson
photography – Heidi Niemata
piano – Renee Neufville, Jean Norris, Kenny Seymour
production – Renee Neufville, Rex Rideout
project coordinator – Tony Vanias
rapping – The LOX
synthesizer – Scott Booker, Jean Norris
trumpet – Kevin Batcheler, Kenyatta Beasley, Mark Leadfoot
vocal arranging – Malik Pendleton
vocals (background) – Will Downing, Malik Pendleton, Zhané

Notes

External links
 
 Saturday Night at Discogs

1997 albums
Motown albums
Zhané albums
Albums produced by Eddie F